The Turkish Journal of Pediatrics is a quarterly peer-reviewed medical journal covering pediatrics. It was established in 1958 by İhsan Doğromaci. The editor-in-chief is Turgay Coşkun. It is published by the Turkish National Pediatric Society, of which it is the official journal.

Abstracting and indexing 
The journal is abstracted and indexed in:

According to the Journal Citation Reports, the journal has a 2013 impact factor of 0.339, ranking it 112th out of 118 journals in the category "Pediatrics".

References

External links 
 
 Turkish National Pediatric Society 

Pediatrics journals
English-language journals
Publications established in 1958
Quarterly journals
Academic journals published by learned and professional societies